Gymnelia paranapanema is a moth of the subfamily Arctiinae. It was described by Paul Dognin in 1911. It is found in São Paulo, Brazil.

References

Gymnelia
Moths described in 1911